Bleep to Bleep is the debut album by the Micronauts, released in 2000. It showcases the duo's raw, electronic and rhythmic style.

Critical reception
The Herald wrote that "the Micronauts are of prime interest to young rips who start dancing whenever a car alarm goes off, but Bleep To Bleep is OK for sentient humans, too."

Track listing
All tracks by The Micronauts

 "Baby Wants to Bleep, Part 1" – 4:38
 "Baby Wants to Rock" – 2:35
 "Baby Wants to Bleep, Part 2" – 3:21
 "Baby Wants to Bleep, Part 3" – 1:55
 "Bleeper 0+2" – 7:10
 "Baby Wants to Bleep, Part 4" – 2:42
 "Bleep to Bleep" – 2:56
 "Baby Wants to Bleep [K]" – 8:19
 "Bleeper" – 10:51

Personnel 

 George Issakidis – Producer
 Nilesh "Nilz" Patel – Mastering

References

2000 debut albums
The Micronauts albums